Garaga may refer to:
 Garaga (genus), a genus of true bugs in the family Delphacidae
 Garaga, India, settlement in India